Yolanda Pantin (born 1954) is a Venezuelan author who has mainly written poetry, although she has also worked in children's literature.

Early life and education
Born in Caracas, the eldest of eleven siblings, she spent her childhood in Turmero, Aragua. There, she studied arts at the Escuela de Artes Plásticas (renamed, Escuela de Artes Visuales Rafael Monasterios). In 1974, she returned to Caracas to study literature at Andrés Bello Catholic University (UCAB).

Career
Pantin, who is included in the literary generation of 1978, founded that year the university group "Rastros". Her first texts appeared in the magazine, which she herself illustrated. The following year, she won an honorable mention in the Francisco Lazo Martí award with Casa o lobo, her first collection of poems, which would be published in 1981 by Monte Ávila Editores.

In 1979, she joined the literary workshop "Calicanto", directed by the writer Antonia Palacios, where she rubbed shoulders with various writers of her generation. In 1981, she left Calicanto and co-founded , which broke with and questioned the nocturnal poetic approaches that prevailed in Venezuela at that time. Tráfico published a literary manifesto that criticized the poetic canons they considered outdated, which had a wide repercussion and promoted aesthetic renovation.

In 1986, the  awarded Pantin a creative scholarship to promote her literary projects. She also worked as a cultural journalist for the weekly Número and as co-editor of Qué Pasa. In 1989, she was one of the founders of the publishing house Pequeña Venecia, which publishes poetry. In 1990, with Santos López, she created the "Casa de la Poesía Foundation".

In 2001, the María Lionza statue in Caracas was the inspiration for Pantin's poem "The pelvic bone"; in the poem, the narrator travels into Caracas for a protest and sees the statue. The image of the pelvis – its "most notable feature" – stays in the narrator's mind, and the poem goes on to address the statue directly.

Pantin has been invited to book fairs and poetry festivals including the First Poetry Biennial (1991) in Val-de-Marne, France, and the Moscow Poetry Biennial (2019). Fond of photography, Pantin participated in the Dedicatorias exhibition held at the Fundación La Poeteca in 2019. There, a selection of images she took in 2008 while making the Trans-Siberian route could be seen.

Awards and honours
 1979, Honorable Mention, Francisco Lazo Martí National Poetry Prize, for Casa o lobo
 1982, Honorable Mention, José Rafael Pocaterra Poetry Biennial, for Correo del corazón
 1989, Fundarte Award, for Poemas del escritor
 1994, List of Honor, International Board on Books for Young People, for Ratón y Vampiro se conocen
 2000, Best Book of the Year Award, children's book category, Centro Nacional del Libro de Venezuela, for ¡Splash!
 2003, Residency at the Bellagio Study Center of the Rockefeller Foundation and the Roberto Celli Memorial Fund scholarship to carry out with Ana Teresa Torres the research project which allowed them to publish, as co-editors, El hilo de la voz. Antología crítica de escritoras venezolanas del siglo XX (Fundación Polar, 2003)
 2004, Guggenheim Fellowship
 2015, Poets of the Latin World Victor Sandoval Award, for her work, Seminar of Mexican Culture and UNAM
 Selected for the anthology Il fiore della poesia latinoamericana d'oggi, volume 2, America meridionale - I
 2017, XVII Premio Casa de América de Poesía Americana, for Lo que hace el tiempo
 2020, XVII  for her literary career

Selected works

Poems
Casa o lobo, colección Los Espacios Cálidos, Monte Ávila Editores, Caracas, 1981 (Ciencuentena de Cincuentena, 2002)
Correo del corazón, Fundación para la Cultura y las Artes del Distrito Federal (Fundarte), Caracas, 1985
El cielo de París, Fondo Editorial Pequeña Venecia, Caracas; 1989
Poemas del escritor, Fundarte, Caracas, 1989
La canción fría, Editorial Angria, Caracas, 1989
Paya (Una elegía), Colecciones Clandestinas, Caracas, 1990
Los bajos sentimientos, Monte Ávila Editores, Caracas, 1993
La quietud, Pequeña Venecia, Caracas, 1998
El hueso pélvico, Grupo Editorial Eclepsidra, Caracas, 2002
La épica del padre, La Nave Va, Caracas, 2002
Poemas huérfanos, La Liebre Libre, Maracay, 2002
País, Fundación Bigott, Caracas, 2007; Frailejón Editores, Bogotá, 2021
21 caballos, editorial La Cámara Escrita, Caracas, 2011
Bellas ficciones, Eclepsidra, Caracas, 2016
Lo que hace el tiempo, Visor editorial, Madrid, 2017
El dragón escondido, Editorial Pre-Textos, Valencia, 2021

Poetry collections/anthologies
Poemas del escritor / El cielo de París, dos poemarios, Fundarte / Alcaldía del Municipio Libertador, Caracas, 1991
Enemiga mía. Selección poética (1981-1997), Iberoamericana Editorial Vervuert, Madrid, 1998
Poesía reunida 1981-2002, Otero Ediciones, Caracas, 2004
Herencia. Selección poética (1981-2004), colección Atlántica, Ediciones Idea, Canarias, 2005
País. Poesía reunida (1981-2011), Editorial Pre-Textos, Valencia, 2014
El ciervo, antología, compilación de Néstor Mendoza; El Taller Blanco Ediciones, Bogotá, 2019

Children's and youth literature
Ratón y Vampiro se conocen, Monte Ávila Editores, Caracas, 1991
Ratón y Vampiro en el castillo, illustrated by Marcela Cabrera; Monte Ávila Editores, 1998
¡Splash!, illustrated by Rosana Faría, Playco Editores, Caracas, 2000
Un caballo en la ciudad, illustrated with photographs by Rosa Virgina Urdaneta, Playco Editores, Caracas, 2002
Ratón y Vampiro, illustrated by Jefferson Quintana, Lugar Común, 2012
Era un tren de noche, illustrated by the same author, Cyls Editores, Caracas, 2018

Non-fiction 
Quién dijo Kartofel?, with Blanca Strepponi, Magenta Ediciones, Caracas, 2006 
Marie Curie, biografía, Los Libros de El Nacional, Caracas, 2005
Nelson Mandela, Los Libros de El Nacional, Caracas, 2006
Viaje al poscomunismo, with Ana Teresa Torres,  Eclepsidra, Caracas, 2020.

Theatre 
 La otredad y el vampiro, Fundarte, Alcaldía de Caracas, 1994

References

External links
 

1954 births
Living people
Writers from Caracas
Andrés Bello Catholic University alumni
20th-century Venezuelan poets
21st-century Venezuelan poets
20th-century Venezuelan women writers
21st-century Venezuelan women writers
Children's writers